Könönen is a Finnish surname. Notable people with the surname include:

Salomon Könönen (1916–1979), Finnish long-distance runner 
Tuomo Könönen (born 1977), Finnish football player 
Valentin Kononen (born 1969), Finnish  race walker

Finnish-language surnames